3181 Ahnert, provisional designation , is a stony Flora asteroid from the inner regions of the asteroid belt, about 8 kilometers in diameter. It was discovered by German astronomer Freimut Börngen at the Karl Schwarzschild Observatory in Tautenburg, eastern Germany, on 8 March 1964.

Orbit and classification 

The S-type asteroid is a member of the Flora family, one of the largest groups of stony asteroids in the main-belt. It orbits the Sun in the inner main-belt at a distance of 2.1–2.4 AU once every 3 years and 4 months (1,216 days). Its orbit has an eccentricity of 0.07 and an inclination of 4° with respect to the ecliptic. The first precovery was obtained at Lowell Observatory in 1931, extending the asteroid's observation arc by 33 years prior to its discovery.

Physical characteristics 

According to the surveys carried out by NASA's space-based Wide-field Infrared Survey Explorer with its subsequent NEOWISE mission, the asteroid measures between 8.0 and 8.6 kilometers and its surface has an albedo between 0.19 and 0.26. The Collaborative Asteroid Lightcurve Link assumes an intermediate albedo of 0.24 – derived from 8 Flora, the largest member and namesake of this orbital family – and calculates a diameter of 8.2 kilometers. As of 2016, the asteroid's rotation period and shape still remain unknown.

Naming 

This minor planet was named after German astronomer Paul Ahnert (1897–1989), author of the annual calendar of astronomical events and a renowned astronomer among professionals and amateurs. His fields of research included the physics of the Solar System and periods of variable stars at the Sonneberg Observatory. (The minor planet 1039 Sonneberga is named after this observatory.) Publisher of several books on performing astronomical observations, he also popularized the subject of astronomy to the general public. The official naming citation was published by the Minor Planet Center on 2 July 1985.

References

External links 
 Asteroid Lightcurve Database (LCDB), query form (info )
 Dictionary of Minor Planet Names, Google books
 Asteroids and comets rotation curves, CdR – Observatoire de Genève, Raoul Behrend
 Discovery Circumstances: Numbered Minor Planets (1)-(5000) – Minor Planet Center
 
 

003181
Discoveries by Freimut Börngen
Named minor planets
003181
19640308